The Fid is a sharp peak rising to  at the eastern side of the mouth of Cole Glacier in southern Graham Land, Antarctica. The peak was photographed from the air by the United States Antarctic Service on September 28, 1940 and was surveyed by the Falkland Islands Dependencies Survey in December 1958. The name, by the UK Antarctic Place-Names Committee, derives from its shape, which suggests the conical wooden pin used in splicing, known as a fid.

References 

Mountains of Graham Land
Bowman Coast